Bayrak (Bayraq) is a rural locality (a village) in Otradovsky Selsoviet, Sterlitamaksky District, Bashkortostan, Russia. The population was 188 as of 2010. There are 13 streets.

Geography 
Bayrak is located 10 km southwest of Sterlitamak (the district's administrative centre) by road. Zagorodny is the nearest rural locality.

References 

Rural localities in Sterlitamaksky District